William E. F. Heeks, Jr. (born 1951), popularly known as Willy Heeks, is an American abstract expressionist painter.

Biography
Heeks was born in Providence, Rhode Island in 1951.  During his childhood, he lived in both Providence and Bristol, Rhode Island.

He participated in the Independent Study Program at the Whitney Museum of American Art in 1973 and earned a BFA from the University of Rhode Island that same year. He studied in the Tyler School of Art's Graduate Program in 1978, and received an honorary Doctorate of Fine Arts from Rhode Island College in 1995.

Heeks lived and painted in New York City for many years before returning to his native Rhode Island in 1996.  He currently resides there.

Awards & Grants
 Recipient: Artist Fellowship, National Endowment for the Arts, 1978
 Recipient: Visual Artist Fellowship, Yaddo, Saratoga Springs, New York, 1980
 Special Projects Exhibition, P.S. 1, Long Island City, NY, 1982
 Recipient: Harriet and Esteban Vicente Fellowship in Painting, 1984
 Recipient: Visual Artist Fellowship, Yaddo, Saratoga Springs, 1984
 Recipient: Louis Comfort Tiffany Award, 1985
 Recipient: Artist Fellowship, National Endowment for the Arts, 1987
 Recipient: Artist Fellowship, National Endowment for the Arts, 1989
 Recipient: Painting Award, American Academy & Institute of Arts & Letters, 1989
 Recipient: Honorary Doctor of Fine Arts, Rhode Island College, 1995
 Recipient: Pollock-Krasner Foundation Grant, 1997
 Recipient: Pollock-Krasner Foundation Grant, 2004
 Recipient: Adolph and Esther Gottlieb Foundation Grant, 2004

The following museums and institutions hold Heeks’s work: 
 Anderson Collection at Stanford University, Stanford, CA
 BP America, Cleveland, OH
 Brooklyn Museum of Art, Brooklyn, NY
 Butler Institute of American Art, Youngstown, OH
 Chase Manhattan Bank, New York, NY
 Cleveland Museum of Art, Cleveland, OH
 Corcoran Gallery of Art, Washington, DC
 DeCordova Museum and Sculpture Park, Lincoln, Massachusetts
 Dow Jones, Inc., New York, NY
 Goldberg, Kohn, Bell, Black, Rosenbloom & Moritz, Chicago, IL
 Henry Kaufman & Co., New York, NY
 Industrial National Bank, Providence, RI
 Inter-Metro Industries Corporation, Wilkes-Barre, PA
 Jefferson Bank, Philadelphia, PA
 Little Caesar's, Inc., Detroit, MI
 Museum of Contemporary Art, Detroit, MI
 Museum of Contemporary Art, La Jolla, CA
 Museum of Fine Arts, Boston, MA
 Museum of Modern Art, New York, NY
 Museum of Art, Rhode Island School of Design, Providence, RI
 Museum of Modern Art, San Francisco, CA
 Naples Museum of Art, Naples, FL
 NYNEX, White Plains, NY
 Peabody Essex Museum, Salem, Mass
 Piper and Marbury, New York, NY
 Portland Museum of Art, Portland, OR
 Progressive Corporation, Shaker Heights, OH
 Prudential Insurance Company, Newark, NJ
 Quad Graphics, Suffix, WI
 Reader's Digest, Pleasantville, NY
 San Francisco Museum of Modern Art, San Francisco, CA
 Sheldon Memorial Art Gallery, University of Nebraska, Lincoln
 Sherman & Sterling, New York, NY
 Smith College Museum of Art, Northampton, MA
 Southeast Banking Corporation, Miami, FL
 Peter Stuyvesant Foundation, Amsterdam, The Netherlands
 Tampa Museum of Art, Tampa, FL
 Tucson Museum of Art, Tucson, AZ
 University of Arizona, Tucson, AZ
 Williams & Sonoma, Inc., San Francisco, CA

References 

1951 births
Living people
Artists from Providence, Rhode Island
American abstract artists
University of Rhode Island alumni
Temple University Tyler School of Art alumni
Painters from Rhode Island
People from New York City